Mutlu, meaning "happy", is a Turkish given name and surname and may refer to:

Given name
 Mutlu Dervişoğlu (born 1977), Turkish footballer
 Mutlu Onaral, American singer of Turkish descent
 Mutlu Topçu (born 1970), Turkish footballer

Surname
 Ayten Mutlu (born 1952), Turkish poet
 Halil Mutlu (born 1973), Turkish weightlifter
 Hüseyin Avni Mutlu (born 1956), Turkish civil servant and Governor of Istanbul
 Mert Mutlu (born 1974), Turkish cyclist and coach
 Özcan Mutlu (born 1968), Turkish-German Green Party politician
 Semiha Mutlu (born 1987), Turkish racewalker

Turkish-language surnames
Turkish masculine given names